The United States Court of Appeals for the Seventh Circuit (in case citations, 7th Cir.) is the U.S. federal court with appellate jurisdiction over the courts in the following districts:
 Central District of Illinois
 Northern District of Illinois
 Southern District of Illinois
 Northern District of Indiana
 Southern District of Indiana
 Eastern District of Wisconsin
 Western District of Wisconsin

The court is based at the Dirksen Federal Building in Chicago and is composed of eleven appellate judges. It is one of 13 United States courts of appeals.

The court offers a relatively unique internet presence that includes wiki and RSS feeds of opinions and oral arguments. It is also notable for having one of the most prominent law and economics scholars, Judge Frank H. Easterbrook, on its court. Richard Posner, another prominent law and economics scholar, also served on this court until his retirement in 2017. Three judges from the Seventh Circuit, Sherman Minton, John Paul Stevens, and Amy Coney Barrett, have been appointed as Associate Justices of the Supreme Court.

Current composition of the court
:

Vacancies and pending nominations

List of former judges

Chief judges

Succession of seats

See also 
 Courts of Illinois
 Judicial appointment history for United States federal courts#Seventh Circuit
 List of current United States Circuit Judges
 Same-sex marriage in the Seventh Circuit

References 

 
 primary but incomplete source for the duty stations
 
 secondary source for the duty stations
 data is current to 2002
 
 source for the state, lifetime, term of active judgeship, term of chief judgeship, term of senior judgeship, appointer, termination reason, and seat information

External links 

 United States Court of Appeals for the Seventh Circuit
 Recent opinions from FindLaw
 Official wiki of the United States Court of Appeals for the Seventh Circuit — Launched April 18, 2007
 The Seventh Circuit Review

 
1891 establishments in the United States
Courts and tribunals established in 1891